The Chinese shrew mole (Uropsilus soricipes) is a species of mammal in the family Talpidae. It is endemic to China, Sichuan Province. Its natural habitat is temperate forests.

References

 EDGE (Evolutionarily Distinct & Globally Endangered)

Mammals of China
Endemic fauna of Sichuan
Uropsilus
EDGE species
Mammals described in 1871
Taxonomy articles created by Polbot